Pasay, officially the City of Pasay, is a 1st class highly urbanized city in the National Capital Region of the Philippines. According to the 2020 census, it has a population of 440,656 people.

Due to its location just south of Manila, Pasay quickly became an urban town during the American colonial period.

History

Early history 

In local folk history about the period before the arrival of Spanish colonizers, Pasay is said to have been part of Namayan (sometimes also called Sapa), a confederation of barangays which supposedly controlled territory stretching from Manila Bay to Laguna de Bay, and which, upon the arrival of the Spanish, eventually became known as Santa Ana de Sapa (modern day Santa Ana, Manila). According to these legends, the ruler of Namayan bequeathed his territories in what is now Culi-culi, Pasay, and Baclaran to one of his sons, named Pasay, explaining the origin of the name.

In another version of the legend, it was Rajah Sulayman of Maynila who bequeathed the territory to his child - also named Pasay, but this time a daughter with the title of Dayang-dayang.

Spanish era
On May 19, 1571, Miguel López de Legazpi took formal possession of the Rajahnate of Maynila and its surrounding polities in the name of the Spanish crown.

Of the many religious orders that came, it was the Augustinian Order who would figure predominantly in the evangelisation of Pasay. The parish of Pasay was governed from the old Namayan capital, since renamed Santa Ana de Sapa, which was under the jurisdiction of the Franciscans. The promise of space in Heaven prompted early native converts to donate their possessions to the Church, with folklore recounting how a baptized Pasay on her deathbed donated her vast estate to the Augustinians. Most of Pasay went to friar's hands either via donation or by purchase; many natives were also forced to divest of their properties to cope with stringent colonial impositions. In 1727, the Augustinians formally took over Pasay and attached it to the Parish of Nuestra Señora de los Remedios in Malate. In that year, Pasay was renamed "Pineda" in honour of Don Cornelio Pineda, a Spanish horticulturist.

In 1862, a number of prominent citizens of Pasay sent a petition to the civil and ecclesiastical authorities asking that they be allowed to manage their own political and religious affairs. On December 2, 1863, Pasay upon the recommendation of the Archbishop of Manila, Gregorio Melitón Martínez Santa Cruz, was granted its own municipal charter, this date is marked annually as the city's official birthday.

Revolution and the Spanish–American War

Pasay produced numerous heroes during the Philippine Revolution. The Katipunan, the organization founded by Andrés Bonifacio that spearheaded the revolution, had a chapter in Pineda organized by Pascual Villanueva, Jacinto Ignacio, and Valentin Ignacio. Several women also fought for the cause of the Katipunan including Marcela Marcelo. The execution of José Rizal, who authored the novels Noli Me Tangere and El Filibusterismo (considered seditious by the colonial government) on December 30, 1896, fanned the flames of the Revolution.

General Emilio Aguinaldo meanwhile declared the independence of the First Philippine Republic on June 12, 1898, and issued decrees providing political reorganization in the country. With this, Don Catalino became Pasay's first Presidente municipal (equivalent to today's Mayor).

Pineda was made the command outpost of the Primera Zona de Manila under Gen. Mariano Noriel, but Gen. Wesley Merritt appealed that the Pineda outpost turned over to the Americans so that they could be closer to the Spanish lines. Thinking Americans were allies, Noriel left Pineda on July 29, allowing American General Greene to transfer. When Intramuros was finally captured, the Filipinos were denied entry to the walled city. Since then, tension simmered between Filipino and American troops, with both sides assigned respective zones but neither observed boundary lines. On the night of February 4, 1899, four Filipinos crossed the American line in Santa Mesa, Manila, and shots were exchanged, triggering the Philippine–American War.

On May 19, 1899, General Noriel was given command again of Pineda. In June, Noriel together with General Ricarte almost defeated the American forces had they exploited the exhaustion of the enemy in the Battle of Las Piñas. Instead, their forces were attacked by American reinforcements and bombarded by warships. The assault forced them to abandon Pineda to occupation by American forces.

American period

On June 11, 1901, Pineda was incorporated into the Province of Rizal. Antonio Dancel was appointed a provincial governor and Pascual Villanueva as municipal president. On August 4, 1901, a resolution was passed petitioning that the original name of Pasay be returned. On September 6, 1901, the Philippine Commission, acting on the request of the townsfolk, passed Act No. 227 renaming Pineda back to Pasay. Two years later, on October 12, 1903, Act No. 942 merged Pasay with the southern municipality of Malibay, expanding its territory. With a population of 8,100 in 1903, Pasay was placed under the fourth-class category together with 9 other municipalities.

Friar lands, then nationalized, were turned into subdivisions. Soon the Pasay Real Estate Company offered friar lands as residential lots for sale or for lease to foreign investors. Postal, telegraph, and telephone lines were installed and branches of Philippine Savings Bank were established. In 1907, a first-class road from Pasay to Camp Nichols was completed. Others were repaired including the old Avenida Mexico, now called the Taft Avenue extension. Transportation services improved. Among the first buses plying routes to Pasay were Pasay Transportation, Raymundo Transportation, Try-tran, and Halili Transit.

By 1908, Meralco tranvia (electric tram car) lines linked Pasay to Intramuros, Escolta, San Miguel, San Sebastian, and San Juan. Automobiles took to the streets, testing their maximum  speed on Taft Avenue. On April 11, 1914, Cora Wong, a nurse at the Chinese General Hospital, became the first woman in the Philippines to fly as a passenger on a flight with Tom Gunn in a Curtiss seaplane off Pasay Beach.

Much of the bayside area beyond Luneta was swamp but American ex-soldiers were quick to seize the opportunity to develop it for residential purposes. By 1918, Pasay had a population of 18,697 because of the exodus of prominent Filipino families and government officials to this seaside town including future president Manuel L. Quezon. By the 1930s, the former rural town had become a suburb of the capital city.

From the 1900s up to the mid-1930s, Philippine National Railway services reached Pasay thru its Cavite Line.

Japanese occupation and the Second Republic 
World War II came and on December 26, 1941, General Douglas MacArthur issued a proclamation declaring Manila and its suburbs (Caloocan, Quezon City, San Juan, Mandaluyong, Makati, and Pasay) an open city. On New Year's Day 1942, Quezon, while in Corregidor, established the City of Greater Manila, wherein Pasay, along with other nearby towns of Rizal, was merged with Manila and Quezon City. He called his secretary Jorge Vargas and appointed him by executive order "the Mayor of Greater Manila". The mayor of Pasay was then Rufino Mateo, who would concurrently serve the vice mayor of the City of Greater Manila for Pasay, governing a town of more than 55,161. During the WWII, many Pasayeños joined in the fight against the Japanese. Jose P. Maibag, born and bred in Pasay, laid out underground networking. Carlos Mendoza, a resident of Barrio San Roque, together with 14 others, formed a mobile broadcasting station called "The Voice of Juan dela Cruz." On July 11, 1942, Japanese military police captured the group. Carling Mendoza, alias Juan de la Cruz" and other members of the group were brought to the old Bilibid Prison and were tortured.

Pasay had to redo the signs all over town, with Filipino was ordered to prevail over English. The national language became a core subject in the secondary school curriculum, while Japanese was taught as well at all levels of education. On October 14, 1943, Japan proclaimed the Second Philippine Republic. Meantime, food had become so scarce that prices soared. Pasay residents began to move away from the city to the provinces outside. The Japanese occupation forces dissolved the City of Greater Manila in 1944 with the establishment of the Philippine Executive Commission to govern occupied regions in the country, thus separating the consolidated cities and towns, with Pasay returning to the province of Rizal. In the middle of February up to early March 1945, as the combined Allied forces began to converge on the way to the Manila area northwards from the south, Pasay suffered enormous damage during the month-long Battle of Manila, and many residents perished either by the Japanese or friendly fire from the combined Filipino and American forces.

Third Republic and the conversion to city status

On February 27, 1945, General MacArthur turned over the government to President Sergio Osmeña. One of Osmeña's first acts was to dissolve the Greater Manila Complex. He then appointed Juan Salcedo Jr., born in Pasay in 1904, as Director of Philippine Health, and then as executive officer of the Philippine Rehabilitation Administration in charge of national recovery from the devastation wrought by the Japanese occupation. Osmeña appointed Adolfo Santos as prewar vice mayor of Pasay, in place of incumbent Moises San Juan who died during the war. He also issued an executive order that would dissolve the City of Greater Manila effective August 1, 1945, thus reinstating Pasay's pre-war status as a municipality of Rizal.

Ignacio Santos Diaz, a congressman from the first district of Rizal, pushed for the conversion of the town into a city and it to be named after Rizal. Republic Act No. 183 was signed into law by President Manuel Roxas on June 21, 1947, officially establishing Rizal City, with Mateo Rufino as Mayor and a population of 88,738. But the residents could not get themselves to call their city by its new name. After two years, eight months, and twelve days of trying, the force of habit prevailed and Rizal province's 1st district congressman Eulogio Rodriguez Jr. filed a bill returning the city to its original name. On May 3, 1950, President Elpidio Quirino, once a resident of Pasay himself, signed into law Republic Act No. 437, which changed the name of Rizal City to Pasay City.

It was also in the 1940s when houses of faith were constructed in different parts of Pasay. Among them was the Church of Our Lady of Sorrows, the Libreria de San Pablo Catholic Women's League, Caritas, the nutrition center, and the grotto of Our Lady of Lourdes. In 1951, two parishes were established: the Parish of San Isidro Labrador and the Parish of San Rafael. By that time the city was once more the aviation center of the country when what is now Ninoy Aquino International Airport opened its doors in 1948.

On June 14, 1955, Pasay regained its power to choose its leader. Pablo Cuneta ran against one-time Mayor Adolfo Santos and became the city's first elected mayor. In 1959, he campaigned again and won against his former vice mayor, Ruperto Galvez. On December 30, 1965, Ferdinand Marcos was sworn in as President of the Philippines, with Fernando Lopez, a resident of Pasay, as vice-president. From that moment Imelda Romualdez Marcos, the then First Lady, became involved in national affairs. On the northern boundary of Pasay, she started filling the waterfront on Manila Bay to build the Cultural Center of the Philippines. In the later decades she would add three more architectural showpieces on reclaimed land in Pasay: the Folk Arts Theater, Film Center, and the Philippine International Convention Center, and later on the PhilCite Exhibition Hall, the basis of what is now today the nation's first ever true amusement park, Star City. The city, through, was also being groomed as a television center for the country, for in 1958, ABS-CBN had opened its brand new television studios on what is now Roxas Boulevard with state-of-the-art equipment, the studios, with color-ready equipment and cameras from Japan plus a number of video recording equipment, were handed over in 1969 to the Radio Philippines Network, which used them until a 1973 fire which ruined the studios, as ABS-CBN had moved northward into Quezon City with the opening of its current studios and offices.

In 1967, Jovito Claudio won the city elections as chief executive against Pablo Cuneta. In the following year, an assassination attempt occurred in Pasay when a Bolivian surrealist painter lunged at Pope Paul VI, with a knife grazing his chest. In 1971, Cuneta was re-elected as city mayor of a growing city of almost 90 thousand people.

New Society

On December 7, 1972, almost two months after martial law was declared, an assassin tried to kill Imelda Marcos. The event took place in Pasay, on live television, while Mrs. Marcos was distributing prizes to the winners of the National Beautification and Cleanliness contest. She suffered some wounds and broken nails but on the whole, she emerged unscathed from that close encounter. On the second anniversary of martial law, Marcos issued Presidential Decree No. 557, declaring every barrio in the country as barangays. Not long after the decree had been put into effect, the Metropolitan Manila Commission and the Department of Local Government instructed Pasay to create its own barangays. Mayor Cuneta, in response, ordered the creation of 487 barangays. Upon the firm suggestion of Local Government and Community Development Secretary Jose Roño, the number of barangays was cut down to two hundred, organized into several zones.

On November 7, 1975, Marcos appointed the First Lady, Imelda, as governor of Metro Manila. The federation consolidated 13 towns and 4 cities including Pasay, which was removed from Rizal province.

Pasay was the host city of Miss Universe 1974, the first time this event had been held in the morning and in the Asia Pacific, and thus was in the international spotlight in the leadup to the pageant day. Half a decade later, the city's first family would become famous nationally in the music scene: Sharon, the then young daughter of the mayor, broke out into the spotlight as a singer with the release of the LP DJ's Pet.

On December 22, 1979, along with Manila, Quezon City, Caloocan, and other cities in the country, Pasay became a highly urbanized city.

In 1981, LRT Line 1 opened its Pasay stations, including its Baclaran terminal on the Parañaque border, marking a return to rapid urban rail.

People Power and contemporary period

The situation changed in the city in the immediate aftermath of the People Power Revolution. Cuneta left his post to be replaced by two acting mayors,  Eduardo Calixto and Norman Urbina, only to be reelected in 1988 and serving for three more terms, before handing over to Jovito Claudio in 1998. Upon the end of his term, he was the city's longest ever city mayor. Claudio, himself replaced by the then vice mayor Wenceslao "Peewee" Trinidad in 2000, saw the building of the MRT Line 3's southern terminus in the city, linked to the LRT Line 1 along Taft Avenue, and the Pasay City General Hospital and Ninoy Aquino International Airport Terminal 2 were both opened to the public. All these and other projects spurred a new era of growth in the city that continues to this day. The EDSA Entertainment Complex, located just to the city's west along EDSA, just miles from the Baclaran, Parañaque, for many years now is very well known for adult entertainment, including prostitution.

In 2006, the SM Mall of Asia, the 4th biggest shopping center overall in the country, was opened, and the area around this mall began to grow into the city's business center in the years that followed, followed on by the opening later on of the city's biggest sports venue, the Mall of Asia Arena. 2 years later, the NAIA Terminal 3 opened its doors in July 2008, and within two years, progress blossomed in the vicinity with the opening of yet another residential and entertainment hub, Newport City, strengthened by the construction of the NAIA Expressway in 2016.

Geography

It borders City of Manila to the north, Parañaque to the south, Makati and Taguig to the northeast, and Manila Bay to the west.

Pasay is composed of seven districts, subdivided into 20 zones, with a total of 201 barangays. The barangays do not have names but are only designated with sequential numbers.

Populated places / barangays in Pasay

Climate
Under the Köppen climate classification system, Pasay features a tropical savanna climate (Köppen climate classification Aw).

Demographics

Economy

Philippine Airlines is headquartered in the Philippine National Bank Financial Center beside the World Trade Center Manila in Pasay. Spirit of Manila Airlines has its headquarters in Roxas Sea Front Garden in Pasay. PAL Express, Cebu Pacific, Air Juan, Interisland Airlines have their headquarters on the grounds of Ninoy Aquino International Airport and in Pasay. Oishi (Liwayway), a snack company, also has its headquarters in Pasay.

National government offices found in Pasay include: Senate of the Philippines, Department of Foreign Affairs (DFA), Civil Aviation Authority of the Philippines, Civil Aeronautics Board, Manila International Airport Authority, the Philippine Department of Trade and Industry's export promotions agency – the Center for International Trade Expositions and Missions (CITEM) – located in the International Trade Complex's Golden Shell Pavilion, and the Overseas Workers Welfare Administration (OWWA), Office for Transportation Security (OTS). The main office of the Philippine National Bank is located in the city.

LBC Express headquarters is located at the Star Cruises Centre in the Newport Cybertourism Zone of Pasay.

Government

Local government
Pasay is governed primarily by the city mayor, the vice mayor, and the city councilors. The mayor acts as the chief executive of the city while the city councilors act as its legislative body. The vice mayor, besides taking on mayoral responsibilities in case of a temporary vacancy, acts as the presiding officer of the city legislature.  The legislative body is composed of 12 regular members (6 per district) and representatives from the barangay and the youth council.

Elected officials

List of former officials

Sports

Pasay is also home to sports venues such as the Cuneta Astrodome and SM Mall of Asia Arena. It will also host some matches in the 2023 FIBA Basketball World Cup at the latter.

Unity Run
On the list of largest running events in the world, based on the number of participants a record 209,000 registered running enthusiasts participated in 2012 Kahit Isang Araw Lang: Unity Run which started and ended at the SM Mall of Asia grounds in Pasay.

The second edition of the race surpassed the Guinness World record of 116,086 participants posted in the Run for the Pasig River on October 10, 2010.

Transportation

Airport
The majority of Ninoy Aquino International Airport complex, also known as Nichols Field, is situated in Pasay, with the airport's terminals 2, 3, and 4, falling under the city's jurisdiction; Terminal 1, the international cargo terminal, and the offices of airport ground servicing companies, are under the jurisdiction of the neighboring Parañaque. The city is also the home of the Philippine Air Force's headquarters, Villamor Airbase.

Roads

Highways and main thoroughfares

Pasay is served by several highways and major thoroughfares. Epifanio delos Santos Avenue (EDSA), Gil Puyat Avenue (Buendia Avenue) Roxas Boulevard, and Taft Avenue function as the city's main thoroughfares. Secondary thoroughfares include Andrews Avenue, Antonio Arnaiz Avenue (formerly known as Libertad Street), Aurora Boulevard, Diosdado Macapagal Boulevard, Domestic Road, Harrison Street, Jose W. Diokno Boulevard, Ninoy Aquino Avenue, and NAIA Road (MIA Road).

Expressways
Four expressways serve Pasay and other parts of Metro Manila and Calabarzon: Skyway, an elevated expressway passing along the Pasay–Taguig boundary; South Luzon Expressway (SLEX), commonly called as SLEX and also components of Radial Road 3 and Asian Highway 26, follows a similar route with Skyway, but runs directly below it, on the ground; NAIA Expressway, an elevated tolled expressway, serves Terminals 1, 2, and 3 of Ninoy Aquino International Airport; and the C-5 Southlink Expressway, which connects Circumferential Road 5 (C-5) in Taguig to its extension across SLEX and eventually to the Manila–Cavite Expressway (CAVITEX).

Public transport

Jeepneys
Jeepneys ply the city's arterial roads, and serve the city's populated areas and nearby cities.

Buses
Buses provide city (commuter) and provincial (intercity) operation on Pasay. Provincial bus terminals are mostly found near the Gil Puyat Station.

Rail
This city is served by two railway lines, the LRT Line 1 and MRT Line 3. LRT Line 1 has four stations in Pasay, namely Gil Puyat (Buendia), Libertad, EDSA, Baclaran, and its depot is located along Airport Road. MRT Line 3 has only one station, named Taft Avenue, which serves as an interchange with LRT Line 1.

Other
Tricycles and pedicabs serve the barangays. Multicab services connect SM Mall of Asia with Baclaran in Parañaque, Buendia Avenue and Pasay Rotonda. Vans, especially UV Express, also provide service throughout the city and to other destinations in Metro Manila.

Education

The Department of Education (DepEd) Division of City Schools – Pasay operates 18 public elementary schools and 8 high schools, and operations are divided into four districts: Pasay North, Pasay East, Pasay South, and Pasay West. Special education is provided by the Philippine School for the Deaf and Philippine National School for the Blind, Pasay SPED Center, and one Alternative Learning System (ALS) center. Numerous private schools, including Catholic and parochial schools, also operate in the city, like the St. Mary's Academy, operated by nuns of the Religious of the Virgin Mary.
 
Colleges and universities

Diplomatic missions

Countries that have set up permanent diplomatic offices or embassies in the city include:

Sister cities

Local
 Las Piñas, Metro Manila
 Parañaque, Metro Manila

International
  Union City, California, United States
  Sacramento, California, United States
  Jecheon, Chungcheongbuk-do, South Korea
  Tainan, Taiwan

Politician
Pablo Cuneta, former Pasay mayor
Wenceslao Trinidad, former Pasay Mayor - Aim High Pasay
Tita Connie Dy, former 2nd District Councilor & former House Of Representative
Justo Justo, columnist and former Pasay councilor
Antonino Calixto, The Transformer Pasay Ex Mayor and incumbent Representative.
Imelda Calixto-Rubiano, first female Mayor of Pasay.
Bong Tolentino, a politician Former 2nd District Councilor 
Eddie Ilarde, former Philippine senator, radio and television host
Fernando Lopez, former 3rd and 7th Vice President of the Philippines
Jose Feria, 109th Associate Justice of the Supreme Court of the PhilippinesỀ
Presbitero Velasco Jr., 157th Associate Justice of the Supreme Court of the Philippines, Governor of Marinduque

Notable personalities

Marcela Marcelo, Filipina Revolutionary General
Francisco Coching, National Artist of the Philippines for Visual Arts, comic book illustrator and writer
Juan Salcedo, Jr., National Scientist of the Philippines for Nutrition and Public Health
Ramon Jacinto, businessman, musician, and previous government official.
Darwin Ramos, Servant of God, Filipino teenager.
Alejandro D. Aclan, Catholic auxiliary bishop for the Archdiocese of Los Angeles
Eli Soriano, Filipino preacher and televangelist.
Wilfred Steven Uytengsu, president and CEO of the Alaska Milk Corporation
Lisa Macuja-Elizalde, Filipino prima ballerina; in 1984, became the first Filipino and the first foreign soloist to join the Kirov Ballet
Anita Linda, Filipino film actress
Sharon Cuneta, Filipino singer, actress, and television host
John Lloyd Cruz, actor
Bernard Palanca, actor
Dominic Ochoa, dramatic actor and comedian
Josephine Roberto, pop singer
Carl Guevara, actor and model
Chariz Solomon, Filipina actress and television personality
Nina Girado, pop/R&B singer, occasional songwriter, record producer, TV and radio personality at ABS-CBN
Maricel Laxa, Filipino comedian and actress
Vhong Navarro, comedian, dancer, member of Streetboys
Wacky Kiray, stand-up comedian and tv host
Diego Llorico, actor
Junna Tsukii, Filipino-Japanese karateka
King Girado, Filipino singer, musician, model, and actor
Michael DiGregorio, professional basketball player
Mike Cortez, professional basketball player
Rodney Brondial, professional basketball player
Ryan Araña, professional basketball player
Yousef Taha, professional basketball player
Silvia Celeste Cortesi, Filipino-Italian model and Miss Universe Philippines 2022

See also

 Bay City, Metro Manila
 Parañaque
 Pasay City West High School

References

External links

 
 [ Philippine Standard Geographic Code]
 

 
Cities in Metro Manila
Populated places on Manila Bay
Populated places established in 1863
1863 establishments in the Philippines
Highly urbanized cities in the Philippines